The Rushing Tide is a 1927 Australian silent film about the search for a hoard of diamonds. It was not a success at the box office and is considered a lost film.

Plot
Harold Wilson inherits a map showing the location of a hoard of diamonds. He sets out to find them with Howard Morrison and his wife. On a lonely stretch of the coast they meet Ruth Jeffries and her father, a fugitive from the police, who has the diamonds. Howard steals the diamonds, kills Jeffries, abducts Ruth, and puts Harold and his wife in an open boat out to sea. Mrs Morrison dies but Harold is rescued. He tracks down Ruth, saves her from Howard – who has discovered the diamonds are worthless – and marries Ruth.

Cast
Beth Darvall as Ruth Jeffries
Norman Lee as Harold Wilson
Irish Roderick as Mrs Morrison
Godfrey Cass as Howard Morrison
Eardley Turner as Jeffries
Dora Mostyn
Edwin Lester
Barry Lock
Brian Ewart
W. Lane Bayliff

Production
The film reunited director Gerald Hayle with Beth Darvall, the star of his previous film, Environment (1927). It was shot in July 1927 partly in an old cinema in the Melbourne suburb of Glenhuntly which had been converted into a studio, with location work done near Portsea, Victoria, at Sorrento, Beauamris and Black Bock, Melbourne.

Release
Hayle announced plans to make another movie with Darvall, The Sanctuary. It does not appear to have been made, but they worked together again on Tiger Island (1930).

References

External links

1927 films
Australian drama films
Australian silent feature films
Australian black-and-white films
1927 drama films
Lost Australian films
1927 lost films
Lost drama films
Films directed by Gerald M. Hayle
Silent drama films